Dermestinae is a subfamily of beetles in the family Dermestidae. It contains the following genera:

 Derbyana Lawrence & Slipinski, 2005
 Dermestes Linnaeus, 1758
 Mariouta Pic, 1898
 Rhopalosilpha Arrow, 1929
†Paradermestes Deng et al., 2017 Jiulongshan Formation, Middle Jurassic, China

References

External links
Dermestinae at ITIS

Dermestidae